Guarani Esporte Clube, commonly known as Guarani de Juazeiro, is a Brazilian football club based in Juazeiro do Norte, Ceará state. They won the Copa Integração once and compete in the Série D.

History
The club was founded on April 10, 1941. Guarani de Juazeiro won the Campeonato Cearense Second Level in 2004, and in 2006. They won the Copa Integração in 2006. Guarani competed in the Série D in 2011, when they were eliminated in the First Stage, after finishing in the third position in their group.

Achievements
 Copa Fares Lopes
 Winners (2): 2012, 2016 
 Copa Integração:
 Winners (1): 2006
 Campeonato Cearense Second Level:
 Winners (2): 2004, 2006 and 2022
 Campeonato Cearense Third  Level:
 Winners (1): 2021

Stadium
Guarani Esporte Clube play their home games at Estádio Mauro Sampaio, nicknamed Romeirão. The stadium has a maximum capacity of 16,000 people.

References

Association football clubs established in 1941
Football clubs in Ceará
1941 establishments in Brazil
Juazeiro do Norte